Burevestnik (Ukraine) or Burevisnyk was the republican affiliation of volunteer sport society Burevestnik in the Ukrainian SSR that existed in 1936 to 1991. Initially the society united workers of state retail industry.

Description
In 1957 to 1987 Burevestnik was an All-Union Volunteer Society associated with students and professors of under-graduate, graduate and post-graduate studies. In 1955 Berevestnik merged with number of other sports societies such as "Iskra", "Trud" (later revived), "Molnia", "Nauka", and "Medik" under its name.

In 1987 the society merged into All-Union Volunteer Sports Society of Trade Unions.

On January 1, 1978 in Ukraine Burevestnik accounted for 386,000 student members.

Olympic laureates

1952 Summer Olympics

1956 Summer Olympics

1960 Summer Olympics
 Larysa Latynina, Kiev (gymnastics)
 Larysa Latynina, Kiev (gymnastics)
 Larysa Latynina, Kiev (gymnastics)
 Boris Shakhlin, Kiev (gymnastics)
 Boris Shakhlin, Kiev (gymnastics)
 Boris Shakhlin, Kiev (gymnastics)
 Boris Shakhlin, Kiev (gymnastics)
 Larysa Latynina, Kiev (gymnastics)
 Larysa Latynina, Kiev (gymnastics)
 Boris Shakhlin, Kiev (gymnastics)
 Boris Shakhlin, Kiev (gymnastics)
 Yuri Titov, Kiev (gymnastics)
 Yuri Titov, Kiev (gymnastics)
 Leonid Bartenev, Kiev (athletics)
 Larysa Latynina, Kiev (gymnastics)
 Yuri Titov, Kiev (gymnastics)
 Boris Shakhlin, Kiev (gymnastics)

1964 Summer Olympics
 Larysa Latynina, Kiev (gymnastics)
 Larysa Latynina, Kiev (gymnastics)
 Boris Shakhlin, Kiev (gymnastics)
 Larysa Latynina, Kiev (gymnastics)
 Larysa Latynina, Kiev (gymnastics)
 Boris Shakhlin, Kiev (gymnastics)
 Boris Shakhlin, Kiev (gymnastics)
 Larysa Latynina, Kiev (gymnastics)
 Larysa Latynina, Kiev (gymnastics)
 Boris Shakhlin, Kiev (gymnastics)
 Yuri Titov, Kiev (gymnastics)
 Yuri Titov, Kiev (gymnastics)

1972 Summer Olympics
 Valeriy Borzov, Kiev (athletics)
 Valeriy Borzov, Kiev (athletics)
 Valeriy Borzov, Kiev (athletics)

1976 Summer Olympics
 Valeriy Borzov, Kiev (athletics)
 Valeriy Borzov, Kiev (athletics)

References

External links
 Central councils of the Volunteer Sports Societies. Russian State Archives.
 Burevisnik at Ukrainian Soviet Encyclopedia

Sports societies in the Ukrainian Soviet Socialist Republic

1936 establishments in Ukraine
Sports organizations established in 1936